is a 1957 black-and-white Japanese film directed by Kaneto Shindō.

Cast 
 Yujiro Ishihara
 Kō Nishimura as Mekkachi
 Jerry Ito as Arab
 Kunio Suzuki as Arab
 Edward Keane as Ship's Cook
 Osman Yusuf as Sailor (as Yusuf Turko)

References

External links 

1957 films
1950s Japanese-language films
Japanese black-and-white films
Films directed by Kaneto Shindo
Daiei Film films
Films scored by Akira Ifukube
1950s Japanese films